Starodrazhzhevo (İśke Draj) is a rural locality (a selo) in Pisarevsky Selsoviet, Sharansky District, Bashkortostan, Russia. The population was 118 as of 2010. There are 2 streets.

Geography 
Starodrazhzhevo is located 19 km northwest of Sharan (the district's administrative centre) by road. Anisimova Polyana is the nearest rural locality.

References 

Rural localities in Sharansky District